Greg Malouf is an Australian chef of Lebanese descent, author and culinary consultant. He is known for instigating modern Middle Eastern cuisine in Australia  and for the influence that his work has had on Middle Eastern cuisine at large. 

Over the course of his career he has accolades including the James Beard Foundation Award for his book Suqar in 2019.  He was also awarded the two hats at the chef's hat awards by the Age Food Guide and Petersham Nurseries Café in Richmond, London acquired a Michelin star while under his leadership. 

He lives in Dubai where he consults with restaurants globally  and owns a spice range called "Malouf's Mezza".

Today, Malouf is considered one of the foremost authorities on Middle Eastern cuisine and has had a significant impact on the way people think about and approach this type of food.

Early life 
Greg Malouf was born in Melbourne to Lebanese parents. He developed an interest in cooking and cuisine at a young age, much to the disapproval of his parents.

He left a message for his parents stating that he wanted to be a chef when he ran away at the age of 18. He spent several nights sleeping in his car until scrounging up a day job cutting metal balustrades and an evening job as a kitchen hand at a Mexican restaurant in Sydney.Then came a formal apprenticeship with Dennis Hagger back in Melbourne, which was followed by several years spent abroad.

Career 
Malouf commenced his training as an apprentice cook at William Angliss Institute in 1979 where he worked at  Watsons, Mietta’s and Two Faces restaurants.He spent some time in Europe from 1981 to 1983 working in various restaurants across the continent. From 1985 until 1988, he resided in Hong Kong and worked as a cook at Restaurant 97 in Lan Kwai Fong, which later changed its name to Post 97. In 1991 he moves back to Melbourne where he was appointed as head chef at The O'connel's Restaurant in South Melbourne, His reputation for contemporary  Middle Eastern food got cemented there and under his leadership the restaurant wins numerous awards. It is the first Middle Eastern restaurant to be awarded a ‘hat’ in The Age Good Food Guide.

In 1999 he published Saha: a chef’s journey through Lebanon and Syria with his then wife Lucy Malouf, the foreword to which would be later written by Anthony Bourdain.

In 2001 Malouf took the helm at the Momo Restaurant where his contemporary approach to Middle Eastern cuisine was met with critical acclaim. During his tenure there, the restaurant successfully earned a one-hat status in The Age Good Food Guide. In 2009 The restaurant was awarded two hats (out of three) in The Age Good Food Guide. In 2010 MoMo Restaurant was awarded two hats in The Age Good Food Guide for the second consecutive year. 

In 2012 Malouf was invited to head up the  Petersham Nurseries Café in Richmond, South London. Under his leadership the restaurant earned a Michelin Star.He left the restaurant briefly after and headed for Dubai. He worked at numerous restaurants in Dubai including Clé and Zahira.

In 2019 , "Suqar Desserts and Sweets From The Modern Middle East" won the James Beard Award for Baking and Desserts.

Malouf has stated  his desire to leave behind hectic restaurant schedules and focus on continuing his work as a culinary consultant

Books

Awards

References 

People from Melbourne

Year of birth missing (living people)
Living people